Umet or Umyot is the name of several inhabited localities in Russia.

Urban localities
Umyot, Republic of Mordovia, a work settlement in Zubovo-Polyansky District of the Republic of Mordovia
Umyot, Tambov Oblast, a work settlement under the administrative jurisdiction of  Umyotsky Settlement Council in Umyotsky District of Tambov Oblast

Rural localities
Umet, Penza Oblast, a village in Rakhmanovsky Selsoviet of Vadinsky District of Penza Oblast
Umet, Saratov Oblast, a selo in Atkarsky District of Saratov Oblast
Umet, Volgograd Oblast, a selo in Umetovsky Selsoviet of Kamyshinsky District of Volgograd Oblast